The 2016 Pirveli Liga was the 28th and last season under the name Pirveli Liga before the division was reorganized into Erovnuli Liga 2. It began on 19 August and ended with relegation play-off finals on 10 December. 

The season was transitional back to the Autumn-Spring system. Apart from this change, the league consisting of 18 teams was due to be reduced to 10 for 2017. Taking into consideration the upcoming exit of four clubs from Umaglesi Liga at the end of this season, a total of twelve teams of Pirveli Liga were doomed for relegation, while no promotion to the top tier was envisaged.

Team changes 
The best two teams of the 2015–16 season Liakhvi Tskhinvali and WIT Georgia were denied promotion to Umaglesi Liga. Georgian Football Federation referred to discrepancies found in submitted license documents as the reason behind this decision. Therefore, they both remained in Pirveli Liga.

To Pirveli Liga

Promoted from Meore Liga
Sulori Vani • Gardabani • Mark Stars

Relegated from Umaglesi Liga
Merani Martvili • Sapovnela Terjola

From Pirveli Liga

Relegated to Meore Liga
Betlemi Keda • Samegrelo Chkhorotsku • Matchakhela Khelvachauri • Algeti Marneuli • Mertskhali Ozurgeti

Promoted to Umaglesi Liga
None

Review
Within four months the clubs completed the regular season in two groups. Those, who qualified for relegation round, took part in play-offs based on the knock-out rule. As a result, even a third-placed team quit the league.    

The season turned out unusual for a large amount of disciplinary decisions made by the Federation with regards to some league members. Overall, 11 teams out of 18 were deducted points for different reasons. Two clubs were found guilty of match-fixing offences, had their points annulled and expelled from the league.

Teams and stadiums

League table

Group Red

Group White

Relegation play-offs

Source

Following these play-offs Merani Martvili and Meshakhte Tkibuli retained their places in Pirveli Liga.

References

External links
 Results, fixtures, tables at Soccerway

Erovnuli Liga 2 seasons
2016 in Georgian football
Georgia